Sydir Vorobkevych (1836–1903) was a Ukrainian composer, writer, Eastern Orthodox priest, teacher, artist, and newspaper editor of Bukovina. He used following pen-names: Danylo Mlaka, Demko Makoviychuk, Morozenko, Semen Khrin, Isydor Vorobkevych, S.Volokh, and others.

Biography 
Sydir Vorobkevych was born 18 May 1836 in Chernivtsi to a family of Orthodox priests and theologians. His brother was Ukrainian poet Hryhoriy Vorobkevych.

Vorobkevych's great-grandfather, Skalsky Mlaka de Orobko, ran away from Lithuania, and his grandfather changed his name from Orobko to Vorobkevych. He later used part of the former name as part of his pseudonym Danilo Mlaka. His mother died early in 1840, and his father Ivan worked in the Chernivtsi Lyceum as a professor of religion and philosophy.  His father died in 1845 and Sydir along with his brother Hryhoriy were left orphans. They went to live with their grandfather, Mykhailo Vorobkevych, the Protopope of Kitsman.

In his family the young Vorobkevyches learned Ukrainian folklore and history. Soon Sydir enrolled in the Chernivtsi Lyceum and later the Theology Seminary in Chernivtsi, graduating in 1861. He began to compose his first verses as a student. After seminary, Vorobkevych began an internship as a priest in the neighboring villages. Later he enrolled in the musical courses of the Vienna Conservatory under professor Franz Krenn.  Since 1867, Vorobkevych had been a singing instructor in the Chernivtsi Theology Seminary and Lyceum, and in 1868 he took a test for certified singing instructor and choir regent.  In 1875, he became a singing instructor at the Theological Department of the Chernivtsi University. During that time, he already worked as a composer creating his own songs, psalms, choir works, operettas, and others.

His first poetic works Vorobkevych published in 1863 in the Halychanyn collection under the title Thoughts from Bukovina. In 1877 he released the first Bukovina almanac Ruthenian hut. Sydir Vorobkevych was one of the creators and chief-editors of the magazine Bokovinian dawn. In Chernivtsi University he headed the "Ruthenian Literary Association" and, starting in 1876, the students' union - "Soyuz". In 1887, Vorobkevych was the leader of the association "Ruthenian house public" in Chernivtsi.

Sydir Vorobkevych wrote in Ukrainian, Romanian, and German languages. Among his works are "Turkish recruits" (1865), poem "Nechai" (1868), dramas "Petro Sahaidachny" (1884), "Kochubei and Mazepa" (1891), "Lost son".

Vorobkevych's talent is depicted most completely in his lyrical poems where the poet "spills the great riches of life's observations enlighten by a quiet sparkling of sincere, deep, human, and people-relating feeling" (Ivan Franko). The prominent characteristics of Vorobkevych's poetry are folklore and a melodious quality.  After a trip to Kiev in 1874, he wrote choir works "Tsar-river our Dnieper" and "I was born upon Dnieper, therefore I am Cossack".

During his lifetime, a collection of his poems entitled on the Prut (1901) was published, edited by Ivan Franko, who called him the "first new spring lark of our national revival."
A series of the poet's series of short stories, novels and essays, called Peru, included "Nero", "Sablya Skanderbeg", "Cleopatra," and "Ivan the Terrible". He was the author of a series of articles "Our composers," which prominently designated composer Mikhail Glinka.  Vorobkevych wrote many and diverse the genre of literary, musical compositions - choruses, songs, and operettas. He wrote music to the words of Ukrainian and Romanian poets like Taras Shevchenko, Ivan Franko, Vasile Alecsandri, Mihai Eminescu, Vasile Bumbac. As a music teacher in particular, among his students was a prominent Austrian musicologist Ukrainian origin Eusebius Mandychevskyy.

Sydir Vorobkevicha died on 19 September 1903 in Chernivtsi.

Works
Vorobkevych is author of several didactic works, among which the following:

 "Manual of musical harmony" (Czernowitz, 1869);
 "Songs of Mass choir of St. John Chrysostom" (1869, ed. II, 1880);
 "Collection of songs for schools people" (Vienna, 1870 and 1889);
 "Songs for schools choral liturgical people" (Vienna, 1870 and 1880)
 "Kurze fur Schule und Haus allgemaine Musiklehre" (Vienna, 1871, ed. II, 1876);
 "Harmony. Collection of Choruses" (Vienna, 1886);
 "Liturgical Songs for male choir" (Czernowitz, 1887);
 "Liturgical Songs for mixed choir" (Czernowitz, 1890);
 "Liturgical Songs for two equal voices" (Czernowitz, 1896) - in collaboration with Eusebius Mandicevschi etc. 
 Over 240 musical compositions (liturgical hymns, choirs worldly religious choirs.),

Ukrainian composers
Artists from Chernivtsi
Writers from Chernivtsi
People from the Duchy of Bukovina
Clergy from Chernivtsi
Ukrainian Austro-Hungarians
1836 births
1903 deaths
Academic staff of Chernivtsi University
Ukrainian people of Lithuanian descent